The Ecclesiastical Leases Act 1571 (13 Eliz 1 c 10) was an Act of the Parliament of England.

The Act provided that conveyances of estates by the masters, fellows, any college dean to anyone for anything other than a term of 21 years, or three lives (meaning three particular lives, such as to a person and then two of his heirs), ‘shall be utterly void’.  The Act was fought over in the Earl of Oxford's case (1615) which decided the precedence between the two main branches of the non-criminal law, which had mainly separate courts until the late 19th century.

What little remained in effect was repealed by section 1(1) of, and Group 1 of Part II of Schedule 1 to, the Statute Law (Repeals) Act 1998.

References
Halsbury's Statutes,

External links
The Ecclesiastical Leases Act 1571, as amended, from Legislation.gov.uk.
The Ecclesiastical Leases Act 1571, revised as of 1 February 1991, from Legislation.gov.uk.

Acts of the Parliament of England (1485–1603)
1571 in law
1571 in England